Laccaria is a genus around 75 species of fungus found in both temperate and tropical regions of the world. They are mycorrhizal. The type species is Laccaria laccata, commonly known as the deceiver. Other notable species include L. bicolor, and the amethyst deceiver (L. amethystina), sometimes incorrectly written as L. amethystea. Because some Laccaria species have the ability to grow vegetatively and/or germinate from basidiospores in culture, they are often used as experimental systems for studies of ectomycorrhizal basidiomycetes. They have a tetrapolar mating system, meaning that there the mating type is controlled by 2 loci. Recently, the genome of L. bicolor has been sequenced.

Description
Laccaria typically have thick, widely spaced, purple to flesh-colored gills that are adnate to slightly decurrent in attachment. The spores are white and ornamented in most species.

Selected species
The following is an incomplete list of Laccaria species reported in the literature:

 Laccaria amethysteo-occidentalis
 Laccaria amethystina
 Laccaria alba
 Laccaria angustilamella
 Laccaria aurantia – China
 Laccaria bicolor
 Laccaria fraterna
 Laccaria fulvogrisea – China
 Laccaria gomezii
 Laccaria japonica – Japan
 Laccaria laccata
 Laccaria longipes
 Laccaria maritima
 Laccaria montana
 Laccaria moshuijun – China
 Laccaria nobilis
 Laccaria ochropurpurea
 Laccaria paraphysata
 Laccaria proxima
 Laccaria pseudomontana
 Laccaria purpureobadia
 Laccaria tetraspora
 Laccaria tortilis
 Laccaria vinaceobrunnea
 Laccaria yunnanensis – China

Gallery

References

External links

  (Archived at: CYBERLIBER: an Electronic Library for Mycology.)
  (Archived at: Archive.org.)
  Field Museum of Natural History. Retrieved 2010-12-12.

 
Agaricales genera
Taxa named by Christopher Edmund Broome
Taxa named by Miles Joseph Berkeley